Fabrizio Lai (born 14 December 1978 in Rho) is a Grand Prix motorcycle road racer from Italy. He currently competes in the CIV Superbike Championship, aboard a MV Agusta F4.

Career
He won the European Championship twice in succession in 1996 and 1997 while still a teenager, before winning the Italian championship in 2002. He has competed in the 125 cc World Championship since 2001, first as a wild card rider, and full-time since the 2003 season on a Malaguti. Lai achieved his first podium finish during the 2004 season as runner-up at Motegi on a Gilera, He finished 6th overall in 2005 and 11th in 2006 as a Honda rider. For 2007, he switched to the Campetella Racing Aprilia team.

Career statistics

Career highlights
1999 - 14th, European 125cc Championship (Honda RS125R)
2000 - 4th, European 125cc Championship (Honda RS125R)
2001 - 5th, Italian CIV 125GP Championship (Honda RS125R)
2002 - 16th, European 125cc Championship (Engineseng) / 1st, Italian CIV 125GP Championship (Engineseng)
2003 - 25th, 125cc World Championship (Malaguti) / 1st, Italian CIV 125GP Championship (Malaguti)
2004 - 16th, 125cc World Championship (Gilera RS 125)
2005 - 6th, 125cc World Championship (Honda RS125)
2006 - 11th, 125cc World Championship (Aprilia RS125)
2007 - 14th, 250cc World Championship (Aprilia RSV 250)
2008 - 18th, 250cc World Championship (Gilera RSV 250)
2009 - NC, Supersport World Championship (Honda CBR600RR)
2010 - 15th, Italian CIV Supersport 600 Championship (Honda CBR600RR)
2011 - 7th, Italian CIV Superbike Championship (Honda CBR1000RR)
2012 - 4th, Italian CIV Superbike Championship (Ducati 1098)
2013 - 13th, Italian CIV Superbike Championship (Kawasaki ZX-10R)

Grand Prix motorcycle racing

Races by year
(key) (Races in bold indicate pole position, races in italics indicate fastest lap)

Supersport World Championship

Races by year
(key) (Races in bold indicate pole position; races in italics indicate fastest lap)

Superbike World Championship

Races by year
(key) (Races in bold indicate pole position) (Races in italics indicate fastest lap)

References

External links
 official site

Italian motorcycle racers
1978 births
Living people
125cc World Championship riders
Superbike World Championship riders
Supersport World Championship riders
People from Rho, Lombardy
Sportspeople from the Metropolitan City of Milan